

Legislative Assembly elections

Orissa

|- style="background-color:#E9E9E9; text-align:center;"
! class="unsortable" |
! Political Party !! Flag !! Seats  Contested !! Won !! Net Change  in seats !! % of  Seats
! Votes !! Vote % !! Change in vote %
|- style="background: #90EE90;"
| 
| style="text-align:left;" |Indian National Congress
| 
| 140 || 82 ||  26 || 58.57 || 12,69,000 || 43.28 ||  5.02
|-
|
| style="text-align:left;" |All India Ganatantra Parishad
|
| 121 || 37 ||  14 || 26.42 || 6,55,099 || 27.23 ||  1.51
|-
| 
| style="text-align:left;" |Praja Socialist Party
|
| 43 || 10 ||  1 || 7.14 || 3,22,305 || 30.43 ||  20.03
|-
| 
| style="text-align:left;" |Communist Party of India
| 
| 35 || 4 ||  5 || 3.57 || 2,33,971 || 27.32 ||  18.92
|-
| 
| style="text-align:left;" |Jharkhand Party
| 
| 9 || 0 || "New" || 0 || 25,602 || 13.57 || "New"
|-
| 
|
| 187 || 7 ||  6 || 5 || 4,26,302 || 20.89 || N/A
|- class="unsortable" style="background-color:#E9E9E9"
! colspan = 3|
! style="text-align:center;" |Total Seats !! 140 ( 0) !! style="text-align:center;" |Voters !! 85,51,743 !! style="text-align:center;" |Turnout !! colspan = 2|31,27,245 (36.57%)
|}

References

External links

 Election Commission of India

1961 elections in India
India
1961 in India
Elections in India by year